The Ultimate Sniper: An Advanced Training Manual for Military and Police Snipers  is a non-fiction book written by John Plaster and published in 1993. An expanded and updated version was published in 2006.

Background
Plaster, a retired U.S. Army major, wrote his book after three tours in the Vietnam War, where he worked behind enemy lines in Laos and Cambodia as part of the Studies and Observation Group.

Overview
Also included in the book is some history on sniping, including background on the British Army's first sniper unit, the Scottish Highland Lovat Scouts.  These scouts fought in the Second Boer War.

Legacy
The book came under the spotlight in October 2006 when a video about "Juba the sniper", who allegedly killed more than 20 U.S. soldiers in Iraq, mentioned it as an inspiration.

References

External links

 Table of contents
 John Plaster interview (archived link)

1993 non-fiction books
Military training books
Sniper warfare